Events from the year 1983 in Sweden

Incumbents
 Monarch – Carl XVI Gustaf
 Prime Minister – Olof Palme

Events
1 January – the Name Act of 1982, replacing the Name Act of 1963, comes into full and legal effect .
The Tiveden National Park was established

Popular culture

Film
16 September – Beyond Sorrow, Beyond Pain released

Births

21 February – Emilie O'Konor, ice hockey player
28 February – Sara Nordenstam, Swedish-born Norwegian swimmer
9 May – Petter Stymne, swimmer
7 July – Nanna Jansson, ice hockey player
11 July – Marie Serneholt, Swedish singer.
6 September – Johanna Wiberg, handball player.
9 September – Frej Larsson, musician
17 October – Åsa Persson, figure skater
19 October – Rebecca Ferguson, Swedish actress 
15 December – Jonas Persson, swimmer.

Exact date missing
Anna Maria Nilsson, biathlete

Deaths
22 February – Georg Rydeberg, film actor (born 1907)
12 May – Olle Ohlson, water polo player (born 1921).
16 June – Aina Wifalk, social scientist and inventor of the modern walker (born 1928).

References

 
Sweden
Years of the 20th century in Sweden